Adam Ant is a British post-punk, new wave artist. He was the lead singer of Adam & the Ants until their split in early 1982, by which time they had recorded three studio albums. Ant, however, would go solo, and release an additional five studio albums throughout the 1980s and early 1990s (one other album recorded during this period remains unreleased but circulates widely as a bootleg). After a gap of nearly 18 years, his sixth released solo studio album came out in early 2013.  A planned follow-up album recorded the following year currently officially remains at developmental stage.

His greatest UK chart success was Adam & the Ants' 1980 album Kings of the Wild Frontier which was number one in the UK Albums Chart for a total of twelve weeks. However, it was the follow-up album, Prince Charming which produced the biggest hit singles with "Stand and Deliver" and the title track, achieving five weeks and four weeks respectively as number one singles on the UK Singles Chart.

In the United States, Ant's biggest chart success was his solo debut, 1982's Friend or Foe album, which reached the Top 20 on the Billboard 200. Three other Ant albums have reached the middle area of the Top 100. Friend or Foe also included the hit single "Goody Two Shoes" which was a Top 20 hit single on the Billboard Hot 100, as well as a third number one single for Ant on the UK Singles Chart.  Ant would achieve further US singles chart success in the 1990s, with "Room at the Top" a second Top 20 hit in 1990 and the "Wonderful" title track a third Top 40 hit in 1995. Friend or Foe achieved US Gold Disc status within a year of its release, Kings of the Wild Frontier crawled to the same certification after nearly 14 years. 

Besides regular studio albums there are a number of live albums, box sets and compilations. The three Peel Sessions first appeared in 1990 (minus two tracks from the first session), while the complete integral one collection appeared in 2001.

Albums

Studio albums

Live albums

Compilation albums

Box sets

EPs

Singles

Videos

Video albums

Music videos

Notes

References

External links
 The Official Adam Ant website

Discographies of British artists
Pop music discographies
Rock music discographies
New wave discographies